AMTI or Amti may refer to one of the following
Association of Mathematics Teachers of India
Airborne moving target indication
Apostolic Missionary Training Institute
Amti a village in Boliney, Abra, the Philippines